KSFL-TV (channel 36) is a television station in Sioux Falls, South Dakota, United States, affiliated with YTA TV. It is owned by Forum Communications Company alongside low-power station KCWS-LD (channel 27). KSFL-TV's studios are located on West 57th Street in Sioux Falls, and its transmitter is located in Rowena.

History
Originally, the station had the call sign KAUN and it was the local Pax TV affiliate, while The WB was carried on a cable-only channel known by the fictitious call sign KWJB. On October 1, 2003, channel 36 acquired the WB affiliation and it became KWSD, and Pax TV was moved to then-sister station KAUN-LP. The programming on KWSD was provided by The WB 100+ Station Group, a predecessor to The CW Plus. In September 2006, The WB and UPN merged to become The CW. KWSD became the CW affiliate for Sioux Falls, and UPN affiliate "UTV", a digital subchannel of KELO-TV, became an affiliate of MyNetworkTV.

At one point in the past decade, KWSD/KAUN had a 9 p.m. newscast that served the Sioux Falls Metro Area and the KWSD viewing area. That newscast was pulled, and reports were that there were plans in the works to bring back a 9 p.m. newscast to the Sioux Falls market.

KWSD's CW affiliation ended on September 10, 2012; at that time, the affiliation moved to a subchannel of KSFY-TV. KWSD switched its affiliation to MeTV on that date. As of September 2015, the MeTV affiliation also moved to KSFY, on their third subchannel; KWSD then became a Retro TV affiliate.

As of June 2020, KWSD ended its affiliation with Retro TV and has been affiliated with YTA TV since that point, solely to keep its cable positions and broadcasting license active in anticipation of a sale partner, with little local programming otherwise, currently limited to the weekend services of the Fountain Springs Church and the Sunday mass from the Roman Catholic Diocese of Sioux Falls.

On November 23, 2022, it was reported that Fargo, North Dakota–based Forum Communications Company would purchase KWSD and sister station KCWS-LD from Jim Simpson for $1.4 million; the sale was completed on February 21, 2023. Forum intends to create a third television news operation in the Sioux Falls market.

On February 24, 2023, the station changed its call sign to KSFL-TV.

Technical information

Analog-to-digital conversion
KSFL-TV (as KWSD) shut down its analog signal, over UHF channel 36, on June 12, 2009, the official date in which full-power television stations in the United States transitioned from analog to digital broadcasts under federal mandate. The station's digital signal relocated from its pre-transition UHF channel 51 to channel 36 for post-transition operations.

References

Mt. Shasta News Archives; Dunsmuir News Archives

External links

 Program Information for KSFL-TV at  TitanTV.com

YTA TV affiliates
SFL-TV
Television channels and stations established in 2001
2001 establishments in South Dakota